The shingle style is an American architectural style made popular by the rise of the New England school of architecture, which eschewed the highly ornamented patterns of the Eastlake style in Queen Anne architecture. In the shingle style, English influence was combined with the renewed interest in Colonial American architecture which followed the 1876 celebration of the Centennial. The plain, shingled surfaces of colonial buildings were adopted, and their massing emulated.

Aside from being a style of design, the style also conveyed a sense of the house as continuous volume. This effect—of the building as an envelope of space, rather than a great mass, was enhanced by the visual tautness of the flat shingled surfaces, the horizontal shape of many shingle style houses, and the emphasis on horizontal continuity, both in exterior details and in the flow of spaces within the houses.

History

McKim, Mead and White and Peabody and Stearns were two of the notable firms of the era that helped to popularize the shingle style, through their large-scale commissions for "seaside cottages" of the rich and the well-to-do in such places as Newport, Rhode Island and the village of East Hampton on the southeastern tip of Long Island. Perhaps the most famous shingle style house built in America was "Kragsyde" (1882) the summer home commissioned by Bostonian G. Nixon Black, from Peabody and Stearns. Kragsyde was built atop the rocky coastal shore near Manchester-By-the-Sea, Massachusetts, and embodied every possible tenet of the shingle style. The William G. Low House, designed by McKim, Mead & White and built in 1887, is another notable example.

Many of the concepts of the Shingle style were adopted by Gustav Stickley, and adapted to the American version of the Arts and Crafts Movement. Additionally, there are several other notable styles of Victorian architecture, including Italianate, Second Empire, Folk and Gothic revival.

Some concentrations of shingle style architecture are listed in the U.S. National Register of Historic Places. Significant listed historic districts include:

 Bay Head Historic District in Bay Head, New Jersey, with several dozen shingle houses
 Houses in Sycamore Historic District, in Sycamore, Illinois
 Fenwick Historic District, perhaps Connecticut's largest concentration, with 17
 Montauk Association Historic District, on Long Island
 Houses in the Glen Ridge Historic District of Glen Ridge, New Jersey

The style was named, together with the Stick Style, by Yale University architectural historian Vincent Scully in his 1949 doctoral dissertation The Cottage Style. This was followed by several magazine articles on the subject, culminating in Scully's The Shingle Style with the Stick Style in 1971 and The Shingle Style Today in 1974.

Characteristics
Architects of the shingle style emulated colonial houses' plain, shingled surfaces as well as their massing, whether in the single exaggerated gable of McKim Mead and White's Low House or in the complex massing of Kragsyde. This impression of the passage of time is enhanced by the use of shingles. Some architects, in order to attain a weathered look on a new building, had the cedar shakes dipped in buttermilk, dried and then installed, to leave a grayish tinge to the façade.

Shingle style houses often use a gambrel or hip roof. Such houses thus emanate a more pronounced mass and a greater emphasis on horizontality.

Shingle style overseas
The shingle style eventually spread beyond North America. In Australia, it was introduced by the Canadian architect John Horbury Hunt in the nineteenth century. Some of his shingle style homes still survive and are heritage-listed. Some of his most notable examples of the style are Highlands, a home in the Sydney suburb of Wahroonga, and Pibrac, in the nearby suburb of Warrawee. The latter house has been featured in a television commercial. Gatehouse, also in Wahroonga, was not one of Hunt's designs, but is heritage-listed.

Examples of the shingle style

See also
 List of architectural styles
 Queen Anne style architecture in the United States
 Victorian architecture

References

Further reading
Scully, Vincent. The Shingle Style Today. New York: George Braziller, 1974. 
Ike, John and Thomas A. Kligerman, Joel Barkley, with Marc Kristal, The New Shingled House, New York: The Monacelli Press, 2015.

External links

  A Look at Shingle Style Architecture: Reflections of the American Spirit, article at ThoughtCo.
 Definition with examples at Phorio Standards

 
19th-century architectural styles
19th-century architecture in the United States
Architectural styles
House styles
Shingle style
Victorian architectural styles
Shingle style
.